Montaigut-le-Blanc may refer to several communes in France:
 Montaigut-le-Blanc, Creuse, in the Creuse département
 Montaigut-le-Blanc, Puy-de-Dôme, in the Puy-de-Dôme département